Religious police are any police force responsible for the enforcement of religious norms and associated religious laws. Nearly all religious police organizations in modern society are Islamic and can be found in countries with a large Muslim populace, such as Saudi Arabia or Iran. The responsibilities of religious police heavily vary by religion and culture. For example, the Islamic religious police prioritize the prevention of alcohol consumption, playing of music and public display of affection, Western holidays, and prayer time absences. On the other hand, the religious police force in Vietnam are responsible for monitoring religious extremists, such as Dega Protestants or Ha Mon Catholics.
As of 2012, at least 17 nations (9% worldwide) have police that enforce religious norms, according to a new Pew Research analysis of 2012 data. These actions are particularly common in the Middle East and North Africa, where roughly one-third of countries (35%) have police enforcing religious norms. As of 2012, religious police forces were not present in any country in Europe or the Americas.

Evolution of religious police 
Religious police can be divided into two categories, those who are upholding the values of a certain religion and those who are responsible for extremist religious groups. Every major religion has a set of rules expected to be followed by their believers as a lifestyle and passages to support its enforcement.

In Islam, the doctrine of Hisbah dictates a duty for the Muslims to promote moral virtue and intervene when another believer is not acting accordingly. The passage holds a core value from the Quran of enjoining good and forbidding wrong. Throughout history, there is evidence that Islamic religious policing has existed for centuries. In the earliest form of religious policing, Muhtasib or “market inspector” is a public official entrusted with preventing fraud, public morality infractions, and disturbance of public order. However, this position disappeared worldwide as society modernize before reappearing in the first Saudi state, Diriyah, from 1745 to 1818. In the early 20th century, Ibn Sa’ud appointed his followers as muhtasibs and very strictly enforced the rules, which caused a conflict between foreign pilgrim and the local population.

The other side of religious policing are forces who are overseeing, if considered to be, religious extremist groups. With the recent spike in interest for religious groups, more people are joining extreme religious groups worldwide. Governments often create a task force in local areas where most group members are based in. However, if an extreme religious group poses a threat to public safety, the responsibility often lies on a more formal intelligence agency instead of a local task force. However, in certain cases, the fear for public safety is simply a ruse to be used as an excuse by governments to limit religious freedom, such as the case of Dega Christians in Vietnam. Ethnic minorities who are Evangelical Christians were chased out of their homes and into the forest as harassment and discrimination against them ran rampant. In Vietnam, a religion must be approved by the VCP (Communist Party of Vietnam) and have their leaders vetted by government authorities for worship services to be legal. However, unregistered Protestant “house churches” in minority areas are deemed “illegal” or a Dega Christian. The Vietnamese Communist Party created a task force to watch the Dega Christians and in some cases, harass and assault them.

Despite its controversial nature, religious police forces are still common in some Islamic societies. These institutions have the powerful support of the conservative part of the population and government officials but are often met with opposition from its younger population and liberals. However, religious police forces often conflicts with local police. For example, the Nigerian State of Kano witnessed a rocky relationship between their religious police force and civil police force. Some religious forces only survived because of protection from the country's constitution, namely Iran and Saudi Arabia. Despite Hassan Rouhani's stern criticism of Iran's religious police, he did not have power to change anything as the acting president.

Formal legalized enforcement by country 

Afghanistan

Afghanistan's Committee for the Propagation of Virtue and the Prevention of Vice was first instituted by the 1992 Rabbani regime, and adopted by the Taliban when they took power in 1996.[9] Taliban's department was modeled on a similar organization in Saudi Arabia.[10] It was closed when the Taliban was ousted, but the Chief Justice of the Supreme Court of Afghanistan reinstated it in 2003.[11] In 2006 the Karzai regime submitted draft legislation to create a new department, under the Ministry for Haj and Religious Affairs, devoted to the "Promotion of Virtue and Prevention of Vice".[9] When the Taliban took power again in August 2021, they established a new "Ministry of Invitation, Guidance and Promotion of Virtue and Prevention of Vice", taking over the old regime's Ministry of Women’s Affairs building for use as its headquarters.[12]

Indonesia

After the 2004 tsunami in Aceh, the people believe that it was a form of punishment from God, which caused the governor, Mustafa Abubakar, to officially launch the Polisi Syariat Islam. The task force started out with 13 officers in 2005 and grew to 62 officers, including 14 females by 2009. However, the organization has a total of more than 1,000 people where at least 400 people are under contract and the rest are volunteers. Polisi Syariat Islam is devoted to catching anyone who does not strictly follow every aspect of the Sharia law. They are known to use excessive tactics, such as stalking and searching properties without proper warrants or motive. Punishments range from a 24-hour hold for physical contact between unmarried people of the opposite sex to beatings for marriage infidelity. 

Since 2001, the Indonesian province of Aceh has enforced its version of Islamic law and has used flogging to punish offenders.  It forbids alcohol, punishes premarital romance, and has little tolerance for the anti-establishment posturing of its tiny punk-rock community. In recent months, Aceh’s Islamic laws have tightened. In September, the local legislature passed a new bylaw, or qanun jinayat, imposing harsher penalties on a longer list of “crimes”. Offences not previously regulated include adultery and same-sex sexual relations, both of which are punishable by public floggings with a thin rattan cane, carried out by a medieval-looking hooded figure to the jeers of onlookers. The penalties for homosexuality are especially harsh. Gay sex, which is not illegal elsewhere in Indonesia, is now punishable by 100 lashes or 100 months in jail. Officials can also demand 1,000 grams of gold – about $38,500 – if they catch gay or lesbian couples in the act. The new bylaw is a watered-down version of a controversial law passed by Aceh’s legislature in 2009, which mandated stoning to death as a punishment for adultery. After the resulting international outrage, the stoning provision was dropped from the new bylaw, which now awaits approval by Indonesia’s Minister of Home Affairs. A decision is expected by September 2015. In the meantime, human rights groups are calling for an end to caning, a practise they say violates not only the Indonesian constitution, but also a raft of international treaties signed by Indonesia.

Iran

Established in 2005, Guidance Patrol (Persian: گشت ارشاد‎,' Gašt-e Eršād) is the main Islamic religious police in Iran, succeeding its similar defunct predecessor. Its mission is to impose Islamic norms of conduct and dress code in public. Similar to the religious police force in Indonesia, they also prioritize the prevention of unrelated men and women mingling without a neutral male guardian (mahram) to watch the women. They have been met with some resistance by women, especially those from more urban and affluent circles, who try to test the boundaries of the dress codes that have been set in place. The morality police are a law enforcement force with access to power, arms and detention centers, she said. They also have control over the recently introduced “re-education centers.” he centers act like detention facilities, where women – and sometimes men – are taken into custody for failing to comply with the state’s rules on modesty. Inside the facilities, detainees are given classes about Islam and the importance of the hijab (or headscarf), and then forced to sign a pledge to abide by the state’s clothing regulations before they are released.

Iran had been dictating to women how they should dress long before the establishment of the current Islamic Republic. In 1936, the pro-Western ruler Reza Shah banned the wearing of allveils and headscarves in an effort to modernize the country. Many women resisted. Then, the Islamic regime that overthrew the Shah’s Pahlavi dynasty made the hjiab compulsory in 1979, but the rule was only written into law in 1983.

A task force with all the powers of a law enforcement agency, the morality police are tasked with ensuring that the rules are followed.

The first of these establishments opened in 2019, said Hadi Ghaemi, executive director of the New York-based Center for Human Rights in Iran, adding that “since their creation, which has no basis in any law, agents of these centers have arbitrarily detained countless women under the pretense of not complying with the state’s forced hijab.” 

The Death of Mahsa Amini took place at the hands of Iranian police. Amini was wearing the hijab incorrectly and was detained. She was also beaten by police and she died in hospital on 16th September. Her death started a series of protests in Iran. During the protests, the police were seen attacking protesters.

Saudi Arabia 

Saudi Arabia has two types of religious police: general police and religious police, also known as the Mutaween. While the general police are tasked with investigating criminal matters and providing national security, the Mutaween specialize in enforcing the strict religious customs of Sharia law. 
Policing in Saudi Arabia represents the pinnacle of the enforcement of Islamic law and customs as it is both an absolute monarchy and a theocracy. With a population of over 27 million people, the second-largest nation in the Middle East sits in a unique religious position as the home of the holy city of Mecca. There are no formal political parties in Saudi Arabia, and political dissenters are sometimes incarcerated. The Mutaween operate under the Committee for the Propagation of Virtue and Prevention of Vice. Their mission is to uphold Islamic law and “enjoining doing what is right and forbidding doing all that is wrong” (Al-Humaidan, 2008, pp. 39–40). The Mutaween enforce segregation of the sexes, the prohibition of alcohol, men attending prayer, suppression of non-Muslim displays or rituals, and the modesty of women (Al-Juwair, 2008; Sharif, 2014). There are about 4000 official religious policemen and additional support staff (Sharif, 2014).

While on patrol, the duties of the Mutaween include, but are not restricted to: ensuring that drugs including alcohol are not being traded;[40] checking that women wear the abaya, a traditional cloak;[citation needed] making sure that men and women who are spotted together in public are related;[40] formerly, enforcing the ban on camera phones; and preventing the population from engaging in "frivolous"[42] Western customs and holidays.[9]

The punishment for such offenses is severe, often involving beatings and humiliation, and foreigners are not excluded from arrest.[43] The Mutaween encourage people to inform on others they know who are suspected of acting unvirtuously, and to punish such activities.

Malaysia

In 1969, the Conference of the Conference of Rulers of Malaysia decided that there was a need for a body to mobilize the development and progress of Muslims in Malaysia, in line with the status of Malaysia as a growing Islamic country and gaining international attention. Realizing this fact, a secretariat to the National Council of Islamic Religious Affairs Malaysia (MKI) was established, to preserve the purity of Islamic beliefs and teachings. The secretariat was later developed as the Religious Division, the Prime Minister's Department which was then re-promoted to the Islamic Affairs Division (Malay: Bahagian Hal Ehwal Islam) (BAHEIS). On 1 January 1997, in line with the growing development and progress of Islam in the country, the Department of Islamic Development Malaysia (JAKIM) was established by the Malaysian government as taking over power and role of BAHEIS.

The formation of JAKIM faced criticism from many groups claiming the established was outlawed by constitution of Malaysia. G25, a group of representing of former civil servant said the established of JAKIM was not aligned with constitution as power of the Conference of Rulers does not include the formation of JAKIM cited of Article 38 of the constitution.[7] However, former Prime Minister, Mahathir Mohamad defended the formation of JAKIM by citing it was aimed at bringing the government in line with Islamic teachings. His statement was supported by Mujahid Yusof Rawa, former Minister in the Prime Minister's Department (Religious Affairs) quoted it was set up to cater to the current needs, including when it comes to managing the budget for the administration of Islamic matters.

Nigeria

The Committee for the Promotion of Virtue and the Prevention of Vice, (abbreviated CPVPV and colloquially termed hai’a (committee), whose enforcers are referred to as muttawa, mutaween (pl.)), are tasked with enforcing conservative Islamic norms of public behavior, as defined by Saudi authorities. They monitor observance of the dress code, gender segregation in public spaces, and whether shops are closed during prayer times.[31]

Established in its best known form in the mid-1970s,[4] by the early 2010s, the committee was estimated to have 3,500–4,000 officers on the streets, assisted by thousands of volunteers and administrative personnel.[32][33] Its head held the rank of cabinet minister and reported directly to the king.[32] Committee officers and volunteers patrolled public places, with volunteers focusing on enforcing strict rules of hijab (which in Saudi Arabia meant covering all of the body except the hands and eyes), segregation between the sexes, and daily prayer attendance;[4] but also banning Western products/activities such as the sale of dogs and cats,[34] Barbie dolls,[35] Pokémon,[36] and Valentine's Day gifts.[3] Officers were authorized to pursue, detain and interrogate suspected violators, flog offenders for certain misdeeds,[37][38] and arrest priests for saying Mass in private ceremonies.[39] In some cases, the Saudi religious police were broadly condemned in the country, including cases of breaking into private homes on suspicion of illicit behavior,[31] and being staffed by "ex-convicts whose only job qualification was that they had memorized the Qur'an in order to reduce their sentences".[40] Perhaps the most serious incident for which they were blamed was the 2002 Mecca girls' school fire, where fifteen girls died and fifty were injured after the mutaween prevented them from escaping a burning school, because the girls were not wearing headscarves and abayas (black robes), and not accompanied by a male guardian. The firemen who arrived to help, were also beaten by the mutaween. Widespread public criticism followed, both internationally and within Saudi Arabia.[41]

The institution had general support among conservative currents of public opinion, but was widely disliked by liberals and younger people.[13] In 2016 the power of the CPVPV was drastically reduced by Mohammed bin Salman,[42][43] and it was banned "from pursuing, questioning, asking for identification, arresting and detaining anyone suspected of a crime".[44]

Sudan

The Community Service Police serves as the Sudanese religious police. Originally called the Public Order Police, the enforcement agency was established in 1993 by President Omar al-Bashir.[13] The Public Order Law was initiated by the Sudanese government in the state of Khartoum in 1992, and later applied to all states. The name was changed in 2006. The Community Service Police is in charge of enforcing regulations on certain personal behaviors, including indecent clothing, alcohol consumption, offensive acts and seduction, among others.[45] In June 2015, 10 female students were charged with "indecent dress" after exiting their church. All of the women were wearing long-sleeved shirts and either skirts or trousers.[46] In December 2017, 24 women were arrested at a private gathering for wearing trousers. They were later released.[47] Punishment can include flogging and the payment of fines. The Public Order Court, which handles such cases, is a parallel court system which exercises summary judgements.[48] Many Sudanese resent the activity of the religious police as oppressive and arbitrarily intrusive, although it is supported by Salafists and other religious conservatives.[13] Following the July 2019 overthrow of Omar al-Bashir, Sudan began a "transition to democracy". In December 2019, it repealed a public order law that granted police the power to arrest women "who were found dancing, wearing trousers, vending on the streets or mixing with men who weren’t their relatives", who might then be punished by "flogging, fines and, in rare cases, stoning and execution".[49] A 3 September 2020 agreement (as part of a 2019 'legal reform program and rebuilding and developing the justice and rights')[50] declared Sudan "a multi-racial, multi-ethnic, multi-religious and multi-cultural society", where the state would "not establish an official religion" and where no citizen would "be discriminated against based on their religion",[51] thus eliminating the raison d'être for the Community Service Police.

Religious police forces
 Committee for the Promotion of Virtue and the Prevention of Vice (Saudi Arabia)
 Committee for the Propagation of Virtue and the Prevention of Vice (Gaza Strip)
 Islamic religious police
 Kano State Hisbah Corps (Nigeria)
 Ministry for the Propagation of Virtue and the Prevention of Vice (Afghanistan)
 Patrol for the Promotion of Virtue and Prevention of Vice (Iran) (also known as Guidance Patrol)
 Shomrim (neighborhood watch group)

See also
 Vice squad
 Presumption of guilt
 Medieval Inquisition

References

Law enforcement
Law enforcement units
Religious law